W.R. Surles Memorial Library is a historic library building located at Proctorville, Robeson County, North Carolina.  It was built in 1951, and is a one-story, front-gabled, one-bay wide, brick building in the Colonial Revival style.  It measures 20 feet wide and 30 feet long. It is a privately operated library open to the public.

It was added to the National Register of Historic Places in 2009.

References

Libraries on the National Register of Historic Places in North Carolina
Colonial Revival architecture in North Carolina
Buildings and structures completed in 1951
Buildings and structures in Robeson County, North Carolina
National Register of Historic Places in Robeson County, North Carolina